Serbian calligraphy (/, /) is a form of calligraphy based on the Cyrillic script used to write the Serbian language. The most notable calligraphists are Zaharije Orfelin (1720–1785), Hristofor Žefarović (d. 1753), and Ivan Boldižar (1917–1986).

List of calligraphists
Jovan the Serb of Kratovo (1526–1583), priest and scribe
Zaharije Orfelin (1720–1785), polymath
Hristofor Žefarović (d. 1753), polymath
Ivan Boldižar (1917–1986)
Vladislav Stanković
Zoran Ilić, painter

See also

Vyaz (Cyrillic calligraphy)
First Belgrade Gymnasium

References

Sources

Further reading

External links

Cyrillic script
Serbian culture
Serbian language
Calligraphy